Mount Lorius is a mountain,  high, standing  north of Mount Allison, in the Monument Nunataks of Antarctica. It was mapped by the United States Antarctic Research Program Victoria Land Traverse Party, 1959–60, and was named by the Advisory Committee on Antarctic Names for French glaciologist Claude Lorius, a member of the traverse party.

References

Mountains of Victoria Land
Pennell Coast